WSTQ (97.7 FM) is a radio station  broadcasting a contemporary hit radio format. Licensed to Streator, Illinois, United States, the station serves the Ottawa, Illinois, area.  The station is currently owned by Mendota Broadcasting.

History

In 1965, the FCC licensed WIZZ-FM to Streator Broadcasting Company, owners of WIZZ AM 1250 (now WSPL). The station became beautiful music WLAX in 1974. In 1984, WLAX became WSTQ and made the switch from beautiful music to a satellite-fed Hot AC format. This lasted until the late 1980s when the station switched to country music.
In 1993, WYYS FM 106.1, also licensed to Streator, joined WSTQ; they simulcasted the country format until the two stations were sold along with co-owned WIZZ AM 1250 to Mendota Broadcasting.

On January 3, 2000, the simulcast with WYYS was split, and WSTQ ran announcements that a format change would be coming the next afternoon. WYYS began simulcasting WIZZ and at 10:00 AM on January 4, 2000, WSTQ changed to top 40; the first song played on the new format was Counting Crows' "Hanginaround".  It was the area's first true CHR station. There were two Hot AC stations—WAJK La Salle and WRKX Ottawa—but they did not play any hard rock or rap, which WSTQ did. WSTQ was also used on a local access channel in Streator as well.

On March 6, 2000, WAIV in Spring Valley, another station owned by Mendota Broadcasting, joined WSTQ and the two stations simulcast the CHR format.  They are known as Q 97.7 and Q103.3. The Federal Communications Commission (FCC) granted a call letter change to WIVQ on February 26, 2001.

On January 24, 2023, it was announced that Studstill Media had sold WSTQ, along with its sister stations, to Shaw Media in Crystal Lake, Illinois, for a total of $1.8 million. The sale is presently under FCC review with anticipation of being completed later in the year.

References

External links

FCC History Cards for WSTQ

STQ
Contemporary hit radio stations in the United States
LaSalle County, Illinois
Streator, Illinois
Radio stations established in 1965
1965 establishments in Illinois